Alejandro 'Álex' Menéndez Díez (born 15 July 1991) is a Spanish professional footballer who plays for Xerez Deportivo FC as either a left back or a left winger.

Club career
Menéndez was born in Gijón, Asturias. A product of Sporting de Gijón's prolific youth academy who started playing as a left winger, he made his senior debut in the 2010–11 season, playing 21 games in the Segunda División B for the reserves, who initially suffered relegation but were later reinstated.

Menéndez first appeared officially with the main squad on 13 December 2011, featuring the full 90 minutes in a 1–0 away win against RCD Mallorca in the round of 32 of the Copa del Rey. On 1 May of the following year he made his La Liga debut, again playing the entire match in a 2–3 home loss to Villarreal CF that all but signified the first team's relegation after a four-year stay.

On 13 August 2013, Menéndez signed a new three-year deal with the club. In summer 2014 he was definitely promoted to Sporting's first team, now in Segunda División.

Menéndez scored his first professional goal on 20 September 2015, the winner in a 3–2 away victory over Deportivo de La Coruña. His second came two rounds later in another away fixture that ended in win, 2–1 at RCD Espanyol.

On 30 July 2016, Menéndez signed a two-year contract with second-tier Girona FC, as a free agent. On 8 August, however, after suffering a severe knee injury, he was released.

On 13 July 2017, Menéndez agreed to a two-year deal at CF Reus Deportiu of the same league. He first moved abroad in the summer of 2018, joining Aris Thessaloniki F.C. from Greece on a two-year contract.

Menéndez returned to Spain on 31 January 2019, after signing a six-month loan deal with division two club Córdoba CF.

Career statistics

Club

References

External links

1991 births
Living people
Spanish footballers
Footballers from Gijón
Association football defenders
Association football wingers
La Liga players
Segunda División players
Segunda División B players
Segunda Federación players
Sporting de Gijón B players
Sporting de Gijón players
Girona FC players
CF Reus Deportiu players
Córdoba CF players
Zamora CF footballers
Salamanca CF UDS players
Super League Greece players
Aris Thessaloniki F.C. players
Spanish expatriate footballers
Expatriate footballers in Greece
Spanish expatriate sportspeople in Greece